Ginásio do Moringão is an indoor sporting arena located in Londrina, Brazil. It is used mainly for basketball and volleyball.  The capacity of the arena is 8,000 people and it was built in 1972.

Indoor arenas in Brazil
Sports venues in Paraná (state)
Basketball venues in Brazil